Out of Control is a Philippine television documentary show broadcast by GMA Network. Hosted by Mariz Umali and Rocco Nacino, it premiered on November 23, 2013 on the network's Sabado Star Power sa Hapon line up replacing Bingit. The show concluded on January 18, 2014 with a total of 8 episodes. It was replaced by GMA Blockbusters in its timeslot.

Ratings
According to AGB Nielsen Philippines' Mega Manila household television ratings, the pilot episode of Out of Control earned a 10.8% rating. While the final episode scored a 7.1% rating.

References 

2013 Philippine television series debuts
2014 Philippine television series endings
Filipino-language television shows
GMA Network original programming
GMA Integrated News and Public Affairs shows
Philippine documentary television series